DWIN (1080 AM) Radyo Agila is a radio station owned and operated by the Eagle Broadcasting Corporation. Its studios and transmitter are located at Brgy. Lucao, Dagupan.

References

Radio stations in Dagupan
Radio stations established in 1976
Iglesia ni Cristo